Donald Keith Guthrie (June 23, 1936 – March 18, 2010) was an American diplomat who was a career Foreign Service Officer. He served as charge' d'affaires in Belize from July 1985 until September 1987.,

Life and career
Guthrie was born on June 23, 1936, and grew up in Las Cruces, New Mexico, with his parents who were professors at New Mexico State University. He attended Las Cruces High School and New Mexico State University. Guthrie graduated from University of California, Berkeley and the Fletcher School of Law and Diplomacy. He studied at the University of Los Andes (Colombia) as a Fulbright Scholar. Guthrie began his career with the State Department in 1961 and stayed until he retired in 1991.

Guthrie died due to complications from Parkinson's Disease at his home in Albuquerque, New Mexico, on March 18, 2010, at the age of 73.

References

1936 births
2010 deaths
Ambassadors of the United States to Belize
The Fletcher School at Tufts University alumni
New Mexico State University alumni
People from Albuquerque, New Mexico
People from Las Cruces, New Mexico
University of California, Berkeley alumni
University of Los Andes (Colombia) alumni